The 1926 Florida Gators football team represented the University of Florida during the 1926 college football season. The season was Harold Sebring's second and least successful campaign as the head coach of the Florida Gators football team.  Sebring's 1926 Florida Gators finished 2–6–2 overall, and 1–4–1 in the Southern Conference, placing nineteenth of twenty-two teams in the conference standings.

The highlights of the season were the Gators' two victories home field over the Florida Southern Moccasins and Clemson Tigers, which were interspersed among four close losses to the Chicago Maroons (6–12), the Ole Miss Rebels (7–12), the Mercer Bears (3–7) and the Kentucky Wildcats (13–18),  crushing defeats by the Georgia Bulldogs (9–32) and coach Wallace Wade's undefeated Alabama Crimson Tide (0–49), and two low-scoring ties with the Hampden–Sydney Tigers (0–0) and the Washington & Lee Generals.

Before the season
Florida was set to play one of its hardest schedules. Former fullback Ray Dickson assisted Sebring.

Bill Middlekauff, a fullback who played on the 1923 and 1924 teams, returned to the squad. Key losses from the previous year included Edgar C. Jones.

Schedule

Season summary

Florida Southern
The season opened with a 16–0 home victory over the Florida Southern Moccasins.

Chicago

Amos Stagg's Chicago Maroons defeated Florida 12–6. A 60-yard forward pass from Walter E. Marks to Apitz scored first for Chicago. Stanley Rouse added two more field goals.

Ole Miss

Ole Miss beat Florida with a "lucky pass." from Petty to Ap Applewhite.

The starting lineup was Stanley (left end), Davis (left tackle), Allen (left guard), Sarra (center), Tucker (right guard), Clemons (right tackle), Oosterhoudt (right end), Walker (quarterback), Owens (left halfback), Merrin (right halfback), Bishop (fullback).

Mercer

The Mercer Bears surprised and beat Florida in a close loss, 7–3. Florida's Bishop made a 30-yard field goal. The game's umpire was Buck Flowers.

The starting lineup was Oosterhoudt (left end), Davis (left tackle), J. Stewart (left guard), Sarra (center), Tucker (right guard), Clemmons (right tackle), Stanley (right end), Bowyer (quarterback), Owens (left halfback), Beck (right halfback), Bishop (fullback).

Kentucky

Once after three days practice, Sebring took his men to Kingsley Lake. Injuries plagued the season.  Florida lost to Kentucky  13–18. The game was hot, "with the thermometer standing in the eihties. A spectator, J. D. Alverman, 50, dropped dead during an exciting moment of the game.

Kentucky scored first, when captain Frank Smith bucked across the goal line. The extra point was missed. Florida took the lead after a Kentucky fumble on a punt was recovered by Tommy Owens. Beck went over, and Owens added the extra point. By a series of forward passes, Kentucky got another touchdown. Owens went right around end for Florida to regain the lead. After a scoreless third period, Kentucky put together a winning touchdown drive in the fourth quarter.

The starting lineup was Oosterhoudt (left end), Clemons (left tackle), Tucker (left guard), Harris (center), Stewart (right guard), Chaplin (right tackle), Dehoff (right end), Bowyer (quarterback), Beck (left halfback), Owens (right halfback), Ihrig (fullback).

Georgia

Georgia crushed the Gators 32–9. The weather was too warm, and the game suffered from several penalties.

The starting lineup was Oosterhoudt (left end), Clemons (left tackle), Ripley (left guard), Sarra (center), Tucker (right guard), Chaplin (right tackle), Trogden (right end), Bowyer (quarterback), Owens (left halfback), Larson (right halfback), Davis (fullback).

Clemson
At home, Florida defeated the Clemson Tigers 33–0. Willie DeHoff caught two touchdowns.

Alabama
Wallace Wade's undefeated national champion Alabama Crimson Tide rolled over the Gators 49–0.

The starting lineup was Stanley (left end), Green (left tackle), Tucker (left guard), Sarra (center), Allen (right guard), Clemons (right tackle), Oosterhoudt (right end), Bowyer (quarterback), Owens (left halfback), Livingston (right halfback), Ihrig (fullback).

Hampden–Sydney

The Gators and the Hampden–Sydney Tigers fought to a scoreless tie. Tommy Owens suffered a broken collarbone.

Washington & Lee
Coach Pat Herron's Washington and Lee Generals tied Florida 7–7.

Postseason
"The wolves began to clamor for Sebring's scalp as the 1926 season ended" wrote Pete Norton.

Players

Depth chart
The following chart provides a visual depiction of Florida's lineup during the 1926 season with games started at the position reflected in parenthesis. The chart mimics a Notre Dame Box on offense.

References

Additional sources
 

Florida
Florida Gators football seasons
Florida Gators football